The Atlantic East Conference men's basketball tournament is the annual conference basketball championship tournament for the NCAA Division III Atlantic East Conference. The annual tournament was held for the first time in 2019, the first season of competitive play in the conference. It is a single-elimination tournament and seeding is based on regular season records.

The winner, while declared conference champion, receives an automatic bid to the NCAA Men's Division III Basketball Championship.

Results

Championship records

Cabrini, Centenary (NJ), Immaculata, and Marywood have not yet qualified for the tournament finals
 Schools highlighted in pink are former members of the AEC

References

NCAA Division III men's basketball conference tournaments
Basketball, Men's, Tournament
Recurring sporting events established in 2019